Afro-Dutch or Black Dutch are residents of the Netherlands who are of Sub-Saharan African ancestry. The majority of Afro-Dutch in the continental Netherlands hail from the former and present Dutch overseas territories Suriname and the former Netherlands Antilles; now Curaçao, Aruba, Bonaire, Sint Maarten, Sint Eustatius and Saba. Of the approximately 500,000 Afro-Dutch people, about 300,000 people, or 60%, are from these territories. There is also a sizable population of Cape Verdean, Ghanaian, Nigerian, Somali, Angolan and other African communities of more recent immigrants. The majority of Afro-Dutch people migrated to the Netherlands from the 1970s onwards, most of the recent migrants arriving either as political refugees seeking freedom or, more often, to escape regional conflicts, such as from Eritrea.

In July 2021, there were 731,444 people reported to be of African ancestry (4.18%, of a total population of 17,475,415 people).

Demographics 
Source:

Notable Afro-Dutch people

Bibliography
 Appiah, Kwame Anthony and Gates, Henry Louis, Jr.(1999). Africana: the Encyclopedia of African and African American Experience. Basic Civitas Books, pp. 1413–1416. .

 Gowricharn, Ruben S. ( 2006 ). Caribbean Transnationalism: Migration, Pluralization, and Social Cohesion. Lexington Books.

References

See also

 Zwarte Hollanders

 
Dutch
Ethnic groups in the Netherlands
Caribbean diaspora by country